Eremothecium is a genus of fungi in the family Dipodascaceae.

References

External links
Index Fungorum

Saccharomycetes